Psalm 62 is the 62nd psalm of the Book of Psalms, beginning in English in the King James Version: "Truly my soul waiteth upon God: from him cometh my salvation". The Book of Psalms is part of the third section of the Hebrew Bible, and a book of the Christian Old Testament. In the slightly different numbering system used in the Greek Septuagint version of the Bible and in the Latin Vulgate, this psalm is Psalm 61. In Latin, it is known as "Nonne Deo subiecta erit anima mea". The psalm offers a warning not to let one's power erode one's trust in God.

The psalm forms a regular part of Jewish, Catholic, Lutheran, Anglican and other Protestant liturgies. Verse 12 is quoted in the New Testament.

Text

Hebrew Bible version 
The following is the Hebrew text of Psalm 62:

King James Version 
 Truly my soul waiteth upon God: from him cometh my salvation.
 He only is my rock and my salvation; he is my defence; I shall not be greatly moved.
 How long will ye imagine mischief against a man? ye shall be slain all of you: as a bowing wall shall ye be, and as a tottering fence.
 They only consult to cast him down from his excellency: they delight in lies: they bless with their mouth, but they curse inwardly. Selah.
 My soul, wait thou only upon God; for my expectation is from him.
 He only is my rock and my salvation: he is my defence; I shall not be moved.
 In God is my salvation and my glory: the rock of my strength, and my refuge, is in God.
 Trust in him at all times; ye people, pour out your heart before him: God is a refuge for us. Selah.
 Surely men of low degree are vanity, and men of high degree are a lie: to be laid in the balance, they are altogether lighter than vanity.
 Trust not in oppression, and become not vain in robbery: if riches increase, set not your heart upon them.
 God hath spoken once; twice have I heard this; that power belongeth unto God.
 Also unto thee, O Lord, belongeth mercy: for thou renderest to every man according to his work.

Contents 
Jeduthun's name stands at the head of this psalms, along with Psalms 39 and 77. In  he is one of the chief singers, and his sons were gatekeepers at the tent of the Ark of the Covenant. His name is mentioned, perhaps, as a special honour.

Uses

New Testament 

Book of Common Prayer 
In the Church of England's Book of Common Prayer, this psalm is appointed to be read on the morning of the 12th day of the month.

Catholic Church 
Until 1912, Psalm 62 was part of the Tenebrae liturgy during the Holy Week.

Silence 
St. Norbet's Arts Center anchors its views on silence in verse 1, "For God alone my soul waits in silence; from him comes my salvation", from Psalm 62.

Musical settings 
Heinrich Schütz composed a choral setting of a metred paraphrase of Psalm 62 in German, "Mein Seel ist still in meinem Gott" (My soul is still in my God) in 1628 as part of the Becker Psalter. 

Max Reger composed a paraphrase of Psalm 62, "Meine Seele ist still zu Gott" (My soul is still towards God) as the second of two sacred songs (Zwei geistliche Lieder) in German for voice (mezzo-soprano or baritone) and keyboard (organ or harmonium or piano), Op. 105, in 1907, the other being "Ich sehe dich in tausend Bildern" on a poem by Novalis. George S. Talbot composed a setting in English, "My soul rests in God alone". They were written for a three-part women's choir and organ, containing Psalm 62 as "Meine Seele ist stille zu Gott", and also Psalms 13 and 141. In 1937, the Danish composer Vagn Holmboe set Psalm 62 for an unaccompanied children's choir. In 2000, Stephen McManus, composed a setting for unison choir, mixed choir, oboe and organ.

"Psalm 62" is a track of the album Pages, the fifth studio album by the 2007 contemporary worship duo Shane & Shane. The Philippine composer Joel P. Navarro wrote a hymn setting in English, "My Soul Finds Rest", to a melody by Arnel dC Aquino, in 2011.

References

External links 

 
 
  in Hebrew and English - Mechon-mamre
 Text of Psalm 62 according to the 1928 Psalter
 For the leader; 'al Jeduthun. A psalm of David. / My soul rests in God alone, from whom comes my salvation. text and footnotes, usccb.org United States Conference of Catholic Bishops
 Psalm 62 – My Only Rock, My Only Salvation text and detailed commentary, enduringword.com
 Psalm 62:1 introduction and text, biblestudytools.com
 Psalm 62 / Refrain: Wait on God alone in stillness, O my soul. Church of England
 Psalm 62 at biblegateway.com
 Hymns for Psalm 62 hymnary.org
 Charles H. Spurgeon: Psalm 62 detailed commentary, archive.spurgeon.org

062
Works attributed to David